Candalides margarita, or Margarita's blue, is a species of butterfly of the family Lycaenidae. It was described by Georg Semper in 1879. It is found in Australia (along the east coast of Queensland and New South Wales) and New Guinea.

The wingspan is about 30 mm. Adult females are black with a large white patch on each wing, and a faint metallic blue suffusion toward the base. Adult males are plain dull blue.

The larvae feed on young shoots and flowers of Amylotheca dictyophleba, Dendrophthoe curvata, Dendrophthoe vitellina, Muellerina celastroides, Amyema congener, Amyema miquelii, Amyema conspicua and Benthamina alyxifolia.  They are attended by the ant Technomyrmex sophiae. The larvae are green, pink or brown. The pupa is attached to a leaf of the host plant by anal hooks and a girdle.

Subspecies
Candalides margarita margarita (Australia: Cape York to Port Macquarie)
Candalides margarita maria Bethune-Baker, 1908 (Aru, Misool, Waigeu, West Irian to Papua)

References

Candalidini
Butterflies described in 1879
Butterflies of Australia
Taxa named by Georg Semper